A straw deed is when two deeds are filed in quick succession, the first from Party A to Party B and then the second from Party B back to Party A.  This is used to sidestep legal restrictions of sales between spouses or joint owners, or to incorporate a new survey description.  Party B is a trusted intermediary, either a close friend or an attorney.

See also 
 Straw purchase
 Straw man (law)
 Straw owner

Real property law